Brian Flynn may refer to:
 Brian Flynn (footballer) (born 1955), Welsh football manager
 Brian Flynn (baseball) (born 1990), American baseball player
 Brian Flynn (cricketer) (1929–1986), Australian cricketer
 Brian Flynn (ice hockey) (born 1988), American ice hockey player
 Brian Flynn, lead vocalist with the American country rock band Flynnville Train
 Brian Patrick Flynn (born 1976), American interior designer and television personality